Colposcenia elegans is a species of bug in the subfamily Aphalarinae. It has a palaearctic distribution in North and East Africa and the Middle East.

References

External links 

 
 Colposcenia elegans at insectoid.info

Aphalaridae
Insects described in 1932